Dolly is an American variety show starring Dolly Parton broadcast in first-run syndication from September 13, 1976, to March 7, 1977.

Background
In the mid-1970s, Parton was approached by Bill Graham, president of Show Biz, Inc., the same company that produced The Porter Wagoner Show (on which Parton had co-starred for seven years). The syndicated variety show Dolly was created soon afterwards.

Production
The pilot episode with Ronnie Milsap was filmed on February 4, 1976, at Opryland Studios. The series began production of the next four episodes the week of April 26–30. The first 11 episodes had been filmed by July and production was scheduled to resume on October 4, according to an article in Billboard. At the time of the article, the series was committed to 71 stations and was expected to reach 130 stations before its premiere in September. The show boasted a budget of up to $100,000 per episode, an impressive sum for a syndicated series, making it the most expensive show to be produced out of Nashville at the time. A variety of celebrities appeared on the show, including Karen Black, Tom T. Hall, Emmylou Harris, The Hues Corporation, Captain Kangaroo, Lynn Anderson, Marilyn McCoo and Billy Davis Jr., Ronnie Milsap, Anne Murray, Kenny Rogers, Linda Ronstadt, KC and the Sunshine Band, and Anson Williams. According to a 1978 biography by Alanna Nash, Parton spoke to Bob Dylan and he initially agreed to do the show, but eventually bowed out due to his discomfort with the television medium at the time.

Among the more well received installments, was one featuring the first televised performance of the Trio: Parton, Emmylou Harris and Linda Ronstadt, a full decade before they released the first of their two critically acclaimed albums.

The show was also the first time Parton and Kenny Rogers worked together; the two would top the country and pop charts in 1983 with their mega hit "Islands in the Stream".

Despite the work that went into the show and the diverse collection of guests, Parton was said to have been less than pleased with the end product, as she found herself singing standards like "My Funny Valentine", which she felt didn't suit her voice or musical style, and interacting with guests with whom she had little in common. She told Nash during a 1977 interview:

"I liked all of the people that were on...but I would have had a totally different lineup of guests myself. It was really bad for me, that TV show. It was worse for me than good, because the people who didn't know me who liked the show thought that's how I was...I mean, I still come through as myself, even with all the other stuff, but not really like I should. Not my real, natural way. And the people who did know me thought I was crazy. They knew that wasn't me. Including me. I didn't know that woman on TV!"

The show lasted only one season despite very high ratings, falling apart when Parton asked out of her contract for a variety of reasons, including the toll that eighteen-hour days were taking on her vocal cords.

Opening and closing themes
The show's opening theme was "Love Is Like a Butterfly". During the opening credits, Parton emerges on a swing and then comes down to sing the opening song, either a cover of a then-current hit, or occasionally one of her own hits.

At the closing of the show, Parton speaks the recitation from "I Will Always Love You", "And I hope life treats you kind, and I hope that you have all you ever dream of. I wish you joy and lots and lots of happiness, but above all this, I wish you love, I love you" and then she says "Goodnight" and sings the rest of the song and the closing credits roll.

Episodes
Dolly originally aired in first-run syndication, meaning its broadcast rights were sold to various television stations around the country. These stations could then choose their own day and time to air the show, as well as what order to air the episodes. Due to this fact, the show aired on different days and times around the county and episodes were shown in various orders. The episodes are presented here in the order they were originally broadcast by WNGE-TV Channel 2 in  Nashville on Mondays at 6:30 PM.

Syndication and home media
During the late 1970s and into the early 1980s, as Parton's popularity grew, Dolly was seen widely in reruns.

On February 27, 2007, six episodes of the series were released on DVD under the title Dolly Parton & Friends.

GetTV began airing select episodes of the series in 2015.

Time Life released the 19-disc box set Dolly: The Ultimate Collection – Deluxe Edition in September 2020 and it features a selection of six episodes of the series, two of which had previously been released on the Dolly Parton & Friends DVD in 2007. Five of the six episodes on the box set  are heavily edited due to copyright issues. To date 10 of the series' 26 episodes have been released on DVD.

References

 Nash, Alanna; 1978. Dolly. Cooper Square Press, New York City.

External links

1976 American television series debuts
1977 American television series endings
1970s American variety television series
First-run syndicated television programs in the United States